Pleurobema clava, the clubshell, club naiad or clubshell pearly mussel, is a species of freshwater mussel, an aquatic bivalve mollusk in the family Unionidae, the river mussels.

This species is endemic to the United States.

Clubshells prefer clean, loose sand and gravel in medium to small rivers and streams, burying themselves in the bottom substrate to depths of up to four inches. Once settled in, clubshells are long-lived, living possibly up to 50 years. Clubshells are endangered, most likely because of agricultural run-off, industrial waste, and the proliferation of the exotic invasive species the zebra mussel.

Prior to its endangered status, clubshells could be found in the Ohio, Cumberland, and Tennessee River systems, and Lake Erie drainages. Currently, however, these mussels can be found in the United States in the states of Illinois, Indiana, Kentucky, Michigan, New York, Ohio, Pennsylvania, Tennessee, and West Virginia.

References

Molluscs of the United States
clava
Bivalves described in 1819
ESA endangered species
Taxonomy articles created by Polbot